Jeffrey Lamar Burris (born June 6, 1972) is an American football coach and former professional football player who was a cornerback in the National Football League (NFL) for ten seasons. He played college football for the University of Notre Dame, and was an All-American. He was selected by the Buffalo Bills in the first round of the 1994 NFL Draft, and he played professionally for the Bills, Indianapolis Colts and Cincinnati Bengals of the NFL. Burris was the assistant defensive backs coach/defensive quality control coach for the Miami Dolphins. On October 8, 2015, Jeff Burris was promoted to assistant defensive backs coach for the Dolphins. On June 3, 2016, he was hired as a defensive analyst for his alma mater, the University of Notre Dame.

Early years
Burris was born in Rock Hill, South Carolina. He graduated from Northwestern High School in Rock Hill, where he played for the Northwestern Trojans high school football team.

College career
While attending the University of Notre Dame, Burris played for the Notre Dame Fighting Irish football team from 1990 to 1993. He was the Irish's primary running back in their goal line jumbo package, rushing for 167 yards on 29 carries and 10 touchdowns and catching one pass for 3 yards and a touchdown. As a senior in 1993, he was recognized as a consensus first-team All-American as a defensive back.

Professional career

In his ten-year career, Burris played in 144 regular season games, started 119 of them, compiling 529 tackles, and 19 interceptions for 302 return yards and two touchdowns.

Coaching career
Burris began his coaching career in 2007 at Fishers High School in Fishers, IN, where he helped work on the technique of cornerbacks and safeties as well as installing a defensive scheme.

Burris joined the United Football League’s Sacramento Mountain Lions as the defensive backs coach in 2011, hired by former Minnesota Vikings and Arizona Cardinals coach Dennis Green. Burris stayed with the Mountain Lions through their 2011 campaign, finishing with a 2–3 record.

On March 5, 2012, Burris was announced as the cornerbacks coach for the UMass Minutemen, working under new head coach Charley Molnar. He coached the Minutemen for the 2012 season.

In 2013 it was announced that Burris would become the assistant defensive backs coach and defensive quality control coach for the Miami Dolphins.

In 2016, it was announced that he would join the Notre Dame football coaching staff as a defensive analyst.

After leaving his Alma mater, he spent the 2017 season coaching defensive backs at the University of Northern Iowa.

In the spring of 2018, Burris was hired by Skip Holtz as the Cornerbacks Coach at Louisiana Tech University.

References

1972 births
Living people
All-American college football players
American football cornerbacks
Buffalo Bills players
Cincinnati Bengals players
Hartford Colonials coaches
Indianapolis Colts players
Louisiana Tech Bulldogs football coaches
Notre Dame Fighting Irish football players
Northern Iowa Panthers football coaches
People from Rock Hill, South Carolina
UMass Minutemen football coaches
People from Fishers, Indiana
Notre Dame Fighting Irish football coaches